Theodor Wilhelm Danzel (4 February 1818, Hamburg – 9 May 1850, Leipzig) was a German literary historian and philosopher.

He studied as the universities of Leipzig, Halle and Berlin, obtaining his doctorate at the University of Jena with a thesis on Plato's philosophical methods (1841). As a student, he was an ardent follower of Hegelian philosophy. In 1845 he received his habilitation at Leipzig, where he subsequently worked as a lecturer.

He died in Leipzig on 9 May 1850 at the age of 32.

Literary works 
 Über Goethes Spinozismus, Hamburg 1843 - On Goethe's Spinozism.
 Über die Ästhetik der Hegelschen Philosophie, Hamburg 1844 - On the aesthetics of Hegelian philosophy.
 Gottsched und seine Zeit, Leipzig 1848 - Johann Christoph Gottsched and his era.
 G. E. Lessing, sein Leben und seine Werke, (with Gottschalk Eduard Guhrauer), two volumes, 1850–1853 - Lessing, his life and works.
 Gesammelten Aufsätzen, collected essays 1855, edited by Otto Jahn (1813–1869).

References 

German literary historians
German philosophers
Writers from Hamburg
Leipzig University alumni
1818 births
1850 deaths
19th-century philosophers
German scholars of ancient Greek philosophy
Hegelian philosophers
Philosophers of art